A. Vijayakumar is the students president  university of jaffna  Sri lanka Tamil Nadu and belongs to the AIADMK.

In June 2016, he was announced as the party's candidate for the Rajya Sabha biennial polls. On 3 June 2016 he was elected unopposed along with three others of his party.

References

Year of birth missing (living people)
Living people
Rajya Sabha members from Tamil Nadu
All India Anna Dravida Munnetra Kazhagam politicians